The 2011–12 Ugandan Big League is the 3rd season of the official second tier Ugandan football championship.

Overview
The 2011–12 Uganda Big League was contested by 19 teams divided into two groups. The Elgon Group was won by Entebbe FC and the Rwenzori Group was won by Kiira Young FC.  The third promotion place went to Victoria University FC who won the promotion play-off with Aurum Roses FC. Entebbe FC finished as overall champions after defeating Kiira Young FC 1-0 in the championship final

Clubs within the Big League enter the Ugandan Cup and a number of clubs reached the last 16.

League standings
The final league tables are not available for the 2011-12 season.  Details of the teams that formed the constitution of the Elgon and Rwenzori Groups are provided below:

Elgon Group
CRO FC
Entebbe Young FC
Iganga Municipal Council FC
Jinja Municipal Council FC
Kirinya United FC
Mbale Heroes FC
Mbarara Old Timers FC
Sharing Youth FC
Soroti Garage FC
Wandegeya FC

Rwenzori Group
Aurum Roses FC
Boroboro Tigers FC
Jogoo Young FC
Kiira Young
Koboko Sports Club FC
Kwania Sports Club FC
Misindye Soana FC
Ndejje University FC
SC Victoria University
Gulu United FC withdrew

Promotion playoff

Semi-finals

Mbarara Old Timers failed to honour the semi-final encounter.

Victoria University won 8-7 on post-match penalties.

Final

Championship playoff

Final

Footnotes

External links
 Uganda - List of Champions - RSSSF (Hans Schöggl)
 Ugandan Football League Tables - League321.com

Ugandan Big League seasons
Uganda
2